Amaro may refer to:

People

Individuals
Amaro (surname)
Amaro (Brazilian footballer) (1901-unknown), Amaro da Silveira, Brazilian football forward
Mariano Amaro (1914-1987), Portuguese football midfielder
Amaro (Angolan footballer) (born 1986), Amândio Manuel Filipe da Costa, Angolan football defender
Saint Amaro, (born 1522-?) a semi-legendary Christian saint

Groups
Amaro people, a community of Brazilian trans-Atlantic slave trade survivors and returnees to Nigeria who claim Afro-Brazilian and\or Afro-Cuban ancestry

Places
Amaro (commune), a municipality in Friuli-Venezia Giulia, Italy
San Amaro, a municipality in Galicia, Spain
Santo Amaro (disambiguation), several places with the name

Other
 Amaro (liqueur), an Italian herbal liqueur
O Crime do Padre Amaro, a novel by 19th-century Portuguese writer Eça de Queiroz
El crimen del Padre Amaro, a 2002 Mexican film by Carlos Carrera
Amaro, the main character of Bom-Crioulo

See also
Amaru (disambiguation)